Vi of Smith's Alley is a 1921 British silent drama film directed by Walter West and starring Violet Hopson, Cameron Carr and George Foley.

Cast
 Violet Hopson - Vi Jeffries 
 Cameron Carr - Sydney Baxter 
 George Foley - Nathaniel Baxter 
 Sydney Folker - Bill Saunders 
 Amy Verity - Eileen Boston 
 Peter Upcher - Reggie Drew 
 Sydney Frayne - Teddy

References

External links

1921 films
British silent feature films
1921 drama films
British drama films
1920s English-language films
Broadwest films
Films directed by Walter West
British black-and-white films
1920s British films
Silent drama films